Take a Look in the Mirror is the sixth studio album by American nu metal band Korn. Released on November 21, 2003 through Epic Records, it is the last Korn studio album to feature their full original lineup, as their original guitarist Brian "Head" Welch left the band in February 2005 until his return in 2013 (with the release of their 2013 album The Paradigm Shift). Original drummer David Silveria also left Korn before the end of 2006 after the release of their next album See You on the Other Side. It was also the last studio album by Korn under the Epic and Immortal labels.

Background
The album continued Korn's lowering in sales, debuting at number 19 and peaked at number 9 with first-week record sales of about 179,000, due to the release date of the album being pushed up to a Friday, with fewer sales than if it was released on the standard Tuesday. The track "Did My Time" was previously released as a CD single for the film Lara Croft Tomb Raider: The Cradle of Life and the track "Right Now" was accompanied by a provocative cartoon video animated by Spike and Mike. The ending track "When Will This End" is followed by a long silence before a live cover of Metallica's "One" starts playing. The album was also released in a "clean" version which utilized backmasking as well as growling in place of profanity.  Take a Look in the Mirror has sold over 1.2 million copies in the US and over 2 million copies outside of the US according to Nielsen SoundScan as of January 4, 2013 and was certified platinum on December 16, 2003. It has been claimed that the album was rushed, due to the lower than expected sales of Untouchables which had left the band in debt. Jonathan Davis has subsequently admitted in interviews that the album was written at somewhat of a rushed pace, due to the lower than expected sales of Untouchables, and having to write with the time restraint of being on that summer's Ozzfest tour.

Composition and music

Take a Look in the Mirror marks Korn's attempt to return to a more aggressive sound as featured on their earlier albums, with guitarists Brian "Head" Welch and James "Munky" Shaffer mostly utilizing thick, heavy distortion and the occasional clean tones for contrast. The album features strong elements of nu metal and has the aggressive sounds featured on their early work, as well as a reworked and re-recorded version of the track "Alive", which had previously only been released on the band's first demo, Neidermayer's Mind. Also of note is the song "Play Me" which features rapper Nas, making Take a Look in the Mirror the first Korn album since Follow the Leader to feature such a collaboration. Furthermore, Davis plays bagpipes on "Let's Do This Now", marking the return of a tradition that has, to date, only been absent on Untouchables. 
 
Around this period, guitarist Head was heavily addicted to drugs such as meth. He said "2003 is when I started using speed every day. I [also] got hooked on meth and in order to get up and function, even play a show, I had to snort lines, you know. And I told myself, 'I'll do this tour, I'll do this Ozzfest, and I'll do meth the whole time and I'll go home and check into a rehab.' And it scared me, you know, 'cause I was like coming every month I would tell myself, 'I'm gonna stop this tour,' and I wouldn't be able to do it. Like a fear would come over me. I was just trapped." Regarding the issues facing the band during the recording, guitarist James "Munky" Shaffer recalled "We weren't in the best space. The songs weren't flowing and the creativity was a bit muted from these personal dramas each of us had." He also claimed the album was a forced effort.

Jonathan Davis said "[This album] is about us as a band, taking a look in the mirror and remembering where we came from, remembering our roots, going back to basics," Davis said. "We reflect and look back why we really got into this band to begin with and why we started it. It's to make aggressive, heavy music. Over the years … we were just experimenting. It always was Korn, but it was different spins on what we were doing. So this time we wanted to make an aggressive, heavy album and just kill it. And that's why we've produced it ourselves. Nobody knows Korn better than ourselves." Davis also stated that he felt a return to basics nu metal album was needed in the music industry of 2003. He said "Nothing coming out is really striking me at all. The whole rock and pop punk scene is just stagnant and boring. Music is not imaginative at the moment. The only record I consider remotely interesting is probably the Outkast album, Speakerboxxx/The Love Below. That's really cool and original."

Reception

Take a Look in the Mirror has received mixed reviews from professional critics but acclaim from fans. Metacritic scores the album 49 based on 9 reviews, indicating "mixed or average reviews", while the user's average score is 8.2/10. AllMusic's Jason Birchmeier states the album is "a little paradoxical, but that's precisely what makes Take a Look in the Mirror so interesting, especially for longtime fans" and goes on to say that "because of the emphasis on brevity and variety (and especially quality), the album's over before you know it and you're left feeling hungry for more Korn." On the contrary, Entertainment Weekly scored the album a D, saying "Korn remain[s] technically proficient, but Take a Look in the Mirror serves only to make the case that the genre has officially screamed itself into caricature." NME gave the album a negative review, criticizing it for being a "self-parody", they wrote "this is an exercise in sterile studio-rock. Meticulously Pro-Tooled, and built almost entirely around bassist Fieldy's relentless, sludgy mid-range, it's an approach that demonstrates little craft and even less actual feeling." In 2005, the album was ranked number 384 in Rock Hard magazine's book of The 500 Greatest Rock & Metal Albums of All Time.

In a 2013 interview, guitarist Head cited Take a Look in the Mirror as "the worst record we did". In 2015, Jonathan Davis also ranked it as his least favourite album in Korn's discography.

Track listing 
All songs written by Korn, except where noted.

 An unofficial Russian edition includes six bonus tracks from Untouchables.
 On some digital versions, the 6 minute silence and the hidden track of a live cover of Metallica's "One" are omitted from "When Will This End".

Personnel
Korn
Jonathan Davis – vocals, bagpipes, production
Head (credited as "Sir Headly") – guitars
Munky (credited as "James the Gorilla") – guitars
Fieldy (credited as "Dog") – bass
David Silveria (credited as "Wally Balljacker") – drums

Production and other credits

Frank Filipetti – production, engineering, mixing
Nas – vocals on "Play Me"
Jim "Bud" Monti – production, engineering
Tim Harkins – engineering
Cailan McCarthy – artist coordination
Doug Erb – art direction
Brandy Flower – art direction
Gayle Boulware – art consultant
Darren Frank – assistant
Jesse Gorman – assistant
Peter Katsis – A&R
Kaz Utsunomiya – A&R
Rob Hill – editing
Fred Maher – editing
Louie Teran – digital editing
Stephen Marcussen – mastering
Polarbear – programming on "I'm Done"
Mitch Ikeda – photography
Marina Chavez – photography

Charts

Weekly charts

Year-end charts

Certifications

Extras

Scrapbook 
The album contains a scrapbook of photos from the band's personal collection, titled "SkЯapbook", instead of a front cover booklet, however, some copies do not feature a booklet, instead, it was released with a normal front and inside cover. The limited edition version contains a bonus DVD. The booklet contains various photos of the band in the early days of Korn previous to this release. Photos in the booklet include them in their first recording studio (the indigo ranch), as well as early tours and shows.

References

2003 albums
Korn albums
Epic Records albums
Immortal Records albums
Albums produced by Frank Filipetti